Listen! The Wind is a 1938 book by the American writer Anne Morrow Lindbergh. It tells the story of Lindbergh's and her husband Charles Lindbergh's 1933 flight from Africa to South America across the Atlantic Ocean. The book focuses on the last ten days of the flight, when weather conditions and illness caused trouble for the couple. The book has a foreword and map drawings by Charles Lindbergh.

The title is taken from the British poet Humbert Wolfe's poem "Autumn Resignation". When the Lindberghs were waiting for enough wind to commence the flight in Gambia, Anne had kept reciting two lines from the poem: "Listen! The wind is rising, and the air is wild with leaves".

Just like Lindbergh's first book, North to the Orient, Listen! The Wind became a bestseller and was among the ten best selling non-fiction books in the United States for two years in a row. It received the National Book Award for Nonfiction.

References

1938 non-fiction books
American memoirs
Aviation books
Books by Anne Morrow Lindbergh
English-language books
Harcourt (publisher) books
National Book Award for Nonfiction winning works